Ansonville Township, population 1,698, is one of eight townships in Anson County, North Carolina. This township includes the town of Ansonville within its boundaries.

Geography
Ansonville Township is bounded by Rocky River and Pee Dee River on the north side, Cedar Creek on the east, and Lanes Creek on the west.  Camp Branch is the only tributary to the Rocky River in the township, Tributaries to the Pee Dee River include Buffalo Creek, Pressley Creek and Brown Creek, which drains most of the southern part of the township.  Tributaries to Brown Creek include Flat Fork, Hurricane Creek, Palmetto Branch, Goulds Fork, Jacks Branch, and Cabin Branch.  Little Creek is the only named tributary to Lanes Creek in the township.

References

Townships in Anson County, North Carolina
Townships in North Carolina